Kiselevo is a rural locality (a village) in Malechkinskoye Rural Settlement, Cherepovetsky District, Vologda Oblast, Russia. The population was 12 as of 2002.

Geography 
Leontyevo is the nearest rural locality.

References 

Rural localities in Cherepovetsky District